This is a list of songs known to have been written by the award-winning American country songwriter Bob McDill.

Songs 

List of songs written by McDill with co-writers, original year released, and original artist with album (if relevant):

References

External links
 

McDill